Parvat Secondary Boarding School (PSBS) is a multi-racial secondary school in Dharan in the eastern part of Nepal. PSBS was the first private school established in Dipendra Chowk district. The medium of instruction is English, with Nepali as an extra subject. Students study science, economics or tourism after Grade 9.

References

Schools in Nepal
Buildings and structures in Sunsari District